Neatishead is a village and civil parish in the English county of Norfolk. Access to Neatishead from the broad is by way of Limekiln Dyke, a narrow channel leading off the broad.

The villages name origin is uncertain 'Vassal's household' or perhaps, 'Snaet's household'.

For the purposes of local government, the parish falls within the district of North Norfolk.

It is well known due to the nearby RAF Neatishead radar station.

References

http://kepn.nottingham.ac.uk/map/place/Norfolk/Neatishead

External links

.
Information from Genuki Norfolk on Neatishead.

North Norfolk
Norfolk Broads
Villages in Norfolk
Civil parishes in Norfolk